North High School was a public high school in Springfield, Ohio, that opened in 1960.  It was one of two high schools in the Springfield City School District, the other school being South High School. On September 8, 2008, the two schools were combined into Springfield High School. The North High School building was demolished on May 30, 2008, to make way for the new Springfield High School building.

North's mascot was the panther and the school colors were scarlet and navy on white.

State championships

 Girls Basketball – 1977

Notable alumni

Randy Ayers – basketball player and head coach for The Ohio State University
Justin Chambers – model and actor on Grey's Anatomy
Marsha Dietlein Bennett – actress
Griffin House – musician/singer-songwriter
Jimmy Journell – professional baseball player in Major League Baseball
John Legend – Grammy and Academy award-winning musician
Will McEnaney - professional baseball player in Major League Baseball

References

External links
 Springfield City School District website

Defunct schools in Ohio
Buildings and structures in Springfield, Ohio
Educational institutions established in 1960
Educational institutions disestablished in 2008
1960 establishments in Ohio
2008 disestablishments in Ohio